Vaartsche Rijn is a railway station in the Dutch city of Utrecht. It is situated on the railway lines between Utrecht and Arnhem and between Utrecht and 's-Hertogenbosch. Construction started in September 2010 and after some delays
was officially opened at 23 August 2016. The station was built as part of ProRail's Randstadspoor project to improve suburban rail travel. Six to eight thousand riders are expected to use the station each day.

The station has 4 tracks with 2 island platforms, 3 underground pedestrian passages and space for 650 bicycles and 200 cars. The platforms can be reached by stairs or transparent lifts, and are sheltered with roofs made of wood. The station is built six meters above street level.

On 14 December 2019, line 22 (the Uithoflijn) of the Utrecht sneltram (light rail) system opened from Utrecht Centraal to the Uithof district with a stop at Vaartsche Rijn station. The stop has two side platforms.

Gallery

References

External links
 NS station page 
 Video about the construction 

Vaartsche Rijn
Railway stations on the Staatslijn H
Railway stations opened in 2016